is a Japanese professional footballer who plays as a forward for  club Kashima Antlers.

Career
Kei Chinen joined J1 League club Kawasaki Frontale in 2017.

In 2020, he was loaned to Kyushu club, Oita Trinita.

In 2023, Chinen joins Kashima Antlers. On 18 February 2023, Chinen debut with club in starting XI against at Kyoto Sanga and first goal in 34th minute until win 2-0 in Matchweek 1.

Career statistics

Club
.

Honours

Club
Kawasaki Frontale
J1 League: 2017, 2018, 2020, 2021
Japanese Super Cup: 2019

References

External links
 
 
 

1995 births
Living people
Aichi Gakuin University alumni
Association football people from Okinawa Prefecture
Japanese footballers
J1 League players
Kawasaki Frontale players
Oita Trinita players
Kashima Antlers players
Association football forwards